Boo! Human is an album by Joan of Arc, released in 2008 on Polyvinyl Records. In May and June 2008, the band promoted it with a cross-country US tour with 31Knots. A music video was released for "A Tell-Tale Penis" on August 8, 2008, directed by Christopher Perkowitz-Colvard.

Track listing
 "Shown and Told" – 3:22
 "Laughter Reflected Back" – 2:44
 "Just Pack or Unpack" – 5:09
 "9/11 2" – 1:19
 "A Tell-Tale Penis" – 3:50
 "Everywhere I Go" – 1:23
 "Vine on a Wire" – 4:57
 "Insects Don't Eat Bananas" – 1:50
 "Lying and Cheating Mind" – 0:25
 "If There Was a Time #1" – 3:29
 "The Surrender #1" – 3:14
 "If There Was a Time #2" – 3:57
 "The Surrender #2" – 4:50
 "So-and-So" – 3:12

References

Joan of Arc (band) albums
2008 albums